The Azekah Inscription, is a tablet inscription of the reign of Sennacherib (reigned 705 to 681 BC) discovered in the mid-nineteenth century in the Library of Ashurbanipal. It was identified as a single tablet by Nadav Na'aman in 1974.

It describes an Assyrian campaign by Sennacherib against Hezekiah, King of Judah, including the conquest of Azekah.

Inscription
The inscription on the combined tablet has been translated as follows:
(3) […Ashur, my lord, encourage]ed me and against the land of Ju[dah I marched. In] the course of my campaign, the tribute of the ki[ng(s)...

(4) […with the mig]ht of Ashur, my lord, the province of [Hezek]iah of Judah like […

(5) […] the city of Azekah, his stronghold, which is between my [bo]rder and the land of Judah […

(6) [like the nest of the eagle? ] located on a mountain ridge, like pointed iron daggers without number reaching high to heaven […

(7) [Its walls] were strong and rivaled the highest mountains, to the (mere) sight, as if from the sky [appears its head? …

(8) [by means of beaten (earth) ra]mps, mighty? Battering rams brought near, the work of […], with the attack by foot soldiers, [my] wa[rriors…

(9) […] they had seen [the approach of my cav]alry and they had heard the roar of the mighty troops of the god Ashur and [their] he[arts] became afraid […

(10) [The city Azekah I besieged,] I captured, I carried off its spoil, I destroyed, I devastated, [I burned with fire…

(11) [     ], a royal ci[ty] of the Philistines (Pi-lis-ta-a-a), which [Hezek]iah had captured and strengthed for himself

Transliteration
Na'aman's transliteration of lines 3, 4, 5 and 11 is shown below:
(3) [… AN.SAR béli u-tak-kil-a] n-ni-ma a-na KUR Ja-[u-di lu al-lik ina] me-ti-iq KASKAL II ja man-da-at-tu sa LU [GAL MES KUR…. amhur….

(4) […ina da-n] a?-ni sa AN.SAR EN-ja na-gu-u [sa mHa-za-qi-j] a-a-u KUR Ja-u-da-a-a GIM […

(5) [… ] URU A-za-qa-a E tuk-la-te-su sa ina bi-ri [t mi-i] s-ri-ja u KUR Ja-u-di […         v

(11) [URU GN URU] LUGAL-ti sa KUR Pi-lis-ta-a-a [sa] [m] [Ha]-[za-qi-j] a-a-u e-ki-mu u-dan-ni-nu-su-ma […

Winckler suggested the text referred not to Judah but to "Yadiya" (Sam'al)

External links
 (Editio princeps) Nadav Na'aman, Sennacherib's "Letter to God" on His Campaign to Judah, Bulletin of the American Schools of Oriental Research, No. 214 (Apr., 1974), pp. 25–39. Also at JSTOR
 Galil, Gershon. “ A NEW LOOK AT THE ‘AZEKAH INSCRIPTION’” Revue Biblique (1946-), vol. 102, no. 3, 1995, pp. 321–329
 The Inscription tablet in the British Museum
 Ancient Israel and Its Neighbors: Interaction and Counteraction
 Biblical Archaeology: Documents for the British Museum: Document 31
 SARGON'S AZEKAH INSCRIPTION: THE EARLIEST EXTRABIBLICAL REFERENCE TO THE SABBATH?

References

8th-century BC inscriptions
7th-century BC inscriptions
19th-century archaeological discoveries
Assyrian inscriptions
7th century BC in Assyria
History of Palestine (region)
Library of Ashurbanipal
Sennacherib